Dagrofa  A/S is a Danish retail company with a market share of around 20% in Denmark as of 2008. The company controls distribution to franchise stores operating under the SPAR and Meny brands in Denmark and owns 43 stores.

In 2013, NorgesGruppen bought a 49% share in Dagrofa from Skandinavisk Holding (owner of Scandinavian Tobacco Group).

In April 2017 Dagrofa announced that all Kiwi stores in Denmark would close. 30 stores will continue under the SPAR or Meny brand.

References

 

Retail companies of Denmark
Companies based in Ringsted Municipality
Danish companies established in 1983
Retail companies established in 1983